Pretty Little Stranger is the fourth studio album by Joan Osborne. The album is her first release on the independent Vanguard Records label, and has been her only album incorporating significant country influences. The record was released in the UK on November 13, 2006 and in the US on November 14.

Track listing
"Pretty Little Stranger" (Osborne)
"Brokedown Palace" (Jerry Garcia, Robert Hunter)
"Who Divided" (Osborne)
"Holy Waters" (Andreas Uetz, Osborne)
"What You Are" (Patty Griffin, Craig Ross)
"Shake That Devil" (Osborne)
"Please Don't Tell Me How the Story Ends" (Kris Kristofferson)
"Time Won't Tell" (Beth Nielsen Chapman, Harlan Howard)
"Dead Roses" (Osborne, Gary Nicholson)
"After Jane" (Osborne)
"'Til I Get It Right" (Red Lane, Larry Henley)
"When the Blue Hour Comes" (Rodney Crowell, Roy Orbison, Will Jennings)
"Losing You All Over Again" (Bonus Track)

Personnel
Credits adapted from CD liner notes.
Musicians
Joan Osborne – lead vocals (all tracks), backing vocals (5), harmony vocals (9)
Eddie Bayers – drums (all tracks)
Steve Buckingham – electric guitar (1, 4–6, 10), tambourine (1, 3), acoustic guitar (5)
Rodney Crowell – harmony vocals (12)
Dan Dugmore – lap steel guitar (5), steel guitar (8)
Paul Franklin – steel guitar (4, 7, 10, 11)
Steve Gibson – electric guitar (1–9, 11, 12), acoustic guitar (6, 10)
Vince Gill – harmony vocals (8)
Tania Hancheroff – harmony vocals (4)
Wes Hightower – harmony vocals (3)
John Hobbs – B3 (1–3, 5, 12), Wurlitzer (1, 3)
Alison Krauss – harmony vocals (4)
Sonny Landreth – slide guitar (9)
Tim Lauer – accordion (8), pump organ (10)
Charlie McCoy – vibes (11)
Gordon Mote – piano (7)
Carmella Ramsey – harmony vocals (1)
Michael Rhodes – bass guitar (all tracks)
Bryan Sutton – acoustic guitar (1–4, 7–9, 11, 12), banjo (6), bouzouki (10)
Dan Tyminski – harmony vocals (7)
Reese Wynans – B3 (9), Wurlitzer (9)

Technical
Steve Buckingham – production
Lesli Halingstad – production assistance
Neal Cappellino – mixing, recording
Don Cobb – mastering
Eric Conn – mastering
Tony Daigle – engineering
Bob Ingison – engineering assistance
Sonny Landreth – recording
Greg Lawrence – engineering assistance
Chip Matthews – digital editing
Marshall Morgan – additional engineering
Steve Short – engineering assistance

Chart performance

References

Joan Osborne albums
2006 albums
Albums produced by Steve Buckingham (record producer)
Vanguard Records albums
Country albums by American artists